Strand's birch mouse (Sicista strandi) is a species of rodent in the family Sminthidae. It is endemic to Russia.

References

Sicista
Mammals of Russia
Endemic fauna of Russia
Taxonomy articles created by Polbot
Mammals described in 1931